Labour Party leadership elections were held in the following countries in 2020:

2020 Labour Party leadership election (Ireland)
2020 Labour Party leadership election (UK)